List of banks registered on the Isle of Man, based on the list of licensed banking institutions from the Isle of Man Financial Services Authority:

References 

 
Isle Of Man
Banks
 
Banks in the Isle of Man
Isle of Man
Isle of Man